Cornel Mărculescu (born 17 July 1941) is a Romanian former water polo player. He competed in the men's tournament at the 1964 Summer Olympics.

Mărculescu later was a referee, officiating the final of the 1972 Olympic water polo tournament. He then worked as the technical director for Spanish Swimming Federation for nearly 10 years. In 1986, he became the executive director of FINA, where he served until 2021.

References

External links
 
International Swimming Hall of Fame profile 

1941 births
Living people
Romanian male water polo players
Olympic water polo players of Romania
Water polo players at the 1964 Summer Olympics
Water polo players from Bucharest